Tikhonovka is a rural locality (a khutor) in Primorskoye Rural Settlement, Kalachyovsky District, Volgograd Oblast, Russia. The population was 217 as of 2010. There are 7 streets.

Geography 
Tikhonovka is located 48 km southeast of Kalach-na-Donu (the district's administrative centre) by road. Kolpachki is the nearest rural locality.

References 

Rural localities in Kalachyovsky District